Michael David Weiss (December 7, 1967 – October 2, 1999) was an American lawyer. He began a class-action lawsuit against hospital syringe distributors in America, in the hope of protecting nurses from accidental syringe sticks.

Early life and education
Michael Weiss was born in Cleveland, Ohio, the son of lawyer Leon and recruiting company founder Marilou. He has one sibling, brother Daniel. The family moved to Bellaire, Texas, in the Greater Houston metropolitan-area, when Weiss was young.

Weiss graduated from Bellaire High School in 1985, where he got to know his future law partner, Paul Danziger, who graduated the year before. They participated together in school debates, where Weiss was the team's captain. Weiss was a national merit scholarship semi-finalist.

Weiss studied philosophy for two years at Harvard University, then attended the University of Texas School of Law, where he also served as an editor for the Texas Law Review, a student law journal. He graduated from the University of Texas in 1993, with special honors in philosophy and a J.D. degree.

Career and social involvement
Following his graduation, Weiss clerked for Judge Edith Jones of the Fifth Circuit Court of Appeals. He also worked with two different law firms. He subsequently co-founded the firm Lawson, Weiss & Danziger, alongside his schoolfriend Paul Danziger. During that time, Weiss worked on different political causes and with various people such as Bruce Hotze and Councilman Rob Todd. He also represented a number of clients in commercial and employment law cases. Together with his associates, Weiss co-chaired two successful whistleblower cases.

Weiss also taught as an assistant professor at the University of Houston Law School and South Texas College of Law. He was a Senior Fellow of the Texas Public Policy Foundation, Distinguished Fellow of the Texas Justice Foundation, and a member of the Houston City Club.

The Safety Syringe Case
In 1998, Mike Weiss and Paul Danzinger were approached by inventor Thomas J. Shaw, who had trouble selling an auto-retractable and single-use syringe (Safety Syringe) because Premier, Inc. and Novation, two largest healthcare group purchasing organizations (GPOs) in the United States, refused to adopt his new, more expensive, safer syringes. The inventor turned his hope toward Mike Weiss and Paul Danziger with those issues. Together, Weiss and Danziger brought a lawsuit against the GPOs, but the case never went to trial. In 2002, lawyer Mark Lanier helped Shaw settle with the two GPOs and, in 2004, settled for $100 million (equivalent to $ million in ) with Becton, Dickinson and Company, the largest manufacturer of medical syringes.

Deaths related to the GPO investigation

Following the civil case, a criminal investigation had been initiated by the United States Attorney's office in Dallas against the GPOs. However, both U.S. Attorneys who prepared and delivered the subpoenas on the investigation of Novation died under mysterious circumstances. On July 20, 2004, lead assistant U.S. Attorney Thelma Quince Colbert was found drowned in her pool, at the age of 55, before she had finished preparing the subpoenas. On September 13, 2004 (55 days later), Criminal Chief of the Dallas U.S. Attorney's office Shannon K. Ross, who signed the subpoenas following Colbert's death, died suddenly because of an inflammation of the meninges, spinal cord, and roots of the spinal nerves, scientifically called meningomyeloradiculitis. Afterwards, the office of United States Attorney General Alberto Gonzales fired, or forced to resign, three other Dallas assistant U.S. Attorneys who happened to be working on that case. A criminal investigation of fraud by GPOs was picked up by United States Attorney's office in Kansas City, under US Attorney Todd Graves, but a number of his staff attorneys were also fired or forced to resign, including Graves himself, by 2006, and the investigation was called off. A later investigation by the Justice Department determined that the dismissals were politically related, though for a list of reasons that did not include the medical fraud investigations.

Death
Weiss died at the age of 32 on October 2, 1999. Weiss' memorial service was held at The United States Court of Appeals Fifth Circuit Ceremonial Courtroom. The official cause of his death is from a drug overdose. The authorities did not pursue further investigation.

In popular culture
Chris Evans starred as Weiss in the 2011 feature film Puncture.

References

Texas lawyers
1967 births
1999 deaths
20th-century American lawyers